Mehtimäen jäähalli is an indoor arena located in Joensuu, Finland. It is the home arena for Jokipojat of the Mestis and Joensuun Kataja's synchronized skaters.

See also
 Joensuu Arena

Indoor arenas in Finland
Indoor ice hockey venues in Finland
Joensuu
Buildings and structures in North Karelia